The men's 4 × 400 metres relayat the 2022 Commonwealth Games, is part of the athletics programme, which took place in the Alexander Stadium on 5 and 7 August 2022.

Records
Prior to this competition, the existing world and Games records were as follows:

Schedule
The schedule was as follows:

All times are British Summer Time (UTC+1)

Results

Round 1
The first three in each heat (Q) and the next two fastest (q) qualified for the final.

Heat 1

Heat 2

Final
The medals were determined in the final.

References

Men's 4 x 400 metres relay
2022